The Fort Clinch State Park is a Florida State Park, located on a peninsula near the northernmost point of Amelia Island, along the Amelia River. Its  include the 19th-century Fort Clinch, sand dunes, plains, maritime hammock and estuarine tidal marsh. The park and fort lie to the northeast of Fernandina Beach at the entrance to the Cumberland Sound.

Fort Clinch

Fort Clinch is a 19th-century brick fortress begun in 1847 after the end of the Second Seminole War. It was named in honor of General Duncan Lamont Clinch, important figure in the First and Second Seminole Wars. No battles were fought at Fort Clinch. Confederate troops occupied the incomplete fort in 1861 when Union forces were withdrawn from Florida. In 1862 Confederate forces were withdrawn from the fort because their manpower was needed elsewhere and Union forces regained control of the area without any shots being fired. Union forces restarted construction of the fort and continued through the end of the war. The fort would become a base of operations for Union forces in the area for the remainder of the Reconstruction Era.

In 1935, the State of Florida bought 256 acres (1.0km2) that included the then-abandoned fort and the surrounding area. Fort Clinch State Park including the fort, opened to the public in 1938.

Recreational activities
In addition to exploring Fort Clinch, activities include pier fishing, sunbathing, hiking, surfcasting, camping, birding, and shelling. Visitors can also enjoy picnicking, swimming, bicycling, beachcombing, and wildlife viewing. Park personnel reenact military life at the fort. Among the wildlife of the park are the rare purple sandpiper, alligators, white-tailed deer, and other birds. Visitors can also see dolphins and manatees.

Amenities include a visitor information center, beach access boardwalks with cold showers as well as restroom/changing rooms, several miles of beach,  of paved road, and a six-mile (10 km) hiking trail. The park has two campgrounds, one on the Amelia River, the other on the Atlantic Beach. The Amelia River campground has two hot-water restroom/shower facilities for 41 campsites in an oak hammock. The Atlantic Beach campground has one hot-water restroom/shower facility for 21 sites with a ramped boardwalk. The park also offers primitive camping and youth camping.

The park is a gateway site for the Great Florida Birding Trail.

Military re-enactments
On the first weekend of each month, costumed interpreters perform living history re-enactments of a Civil War soldiers life in 1864 at Fort Clinch.  Activities include military drills, and working in the fort's laundry, infirmary, kitchen, barracks, quartermaster, United States Sanitary Commission and carpenter shop.

The fort holds other encampments during the year.

Hours
The park is open from 8:00 am until sundown year round.

Gallery

References

External links
 
Fort Clinch State Park at Florida State Parks
Nassau County listings at National Register of Historic Places
Nassau County listings at Florida's Office of Cultural and Historical Programs
Fort Clinch State Park at Florida Parks
Florida Historic Places - Fort Clinch at The National Park Service - Links to the Past
Exploring Florida - Fort Clinch Photo Gallery at The Florida Center for Instructional Technology

State parks of Florida
Historic American Landscapes Survey in Florida
History of Jacksonville, Florida
Parks in Nassau County, Florida
Museums in Nassau County, Florida
Military and war museums in Florida
Living museums in Florida
Protected areas established in 1935
1905 establishments in Florida
Parks on the National Register of Historic Places in Florida
Forts on the National Register of Historic Places in Florida
National Register of Historic Places in Nassau County, Florida
Amelia Island
Civilian Conservation Corps in Florida
National Park Service rustic in Florida